Anne-Louise Le Jeuneux, sometimes Lejeuneux or Jeuneux, later Baudin de La Chesnaye (died 15 April 1794) was a French painter.

Le Jeuneux is first recorded in 1755, when she produced a map of the night sky over the southern hemisphere for the astronomer Nicolas-Louis de Lacaille, after his drawing; this is today in the collection of the Paris Observatory. She also painted his portrait in 1762. The two were evidently close, for he asked after her in a number of his letters home from his expedition to Africa. She was the daughter or sister of a M. Le Jeuneux who kept a cabinet of curiosities at the Hôtel de Chavigny and was acquainted with Benjamin Franklin. Le Jeuneux produced a number of portraits in oils, as well as at least one pastel, dated 1763. She is known to have held a salon. She married André Baudin de La Chesnaye, sometimes Chenaye (1732–1792), a former mousquetaire, chevalier de Saint-Louis, and later commander of the Paris national guard who was among those massacred at the La Force Prison in 1792. Anne-Louise drowned herself in the Seine two years later, upon the decree of the Banishment of Nobles by the Committee of Public Safety.

References

Year of birth unknown
1794 deaths
French women painters
18th-century French painters
18th-century French women artists
Painters from Paris
Painters who committed suicide
Suicides by drowning in France
French salon-holders